This list of botanical gardens and arboretums in Montana is intended to include all significant botanical gardens and arboretums in the U.S. state of Montana

See also
List of botanical gardens and arboretums in the United States

References 

 
Arboreta in Montana
botanical gardens and arboretums in Montana